Fernand Desnoyers, full name Félix-Emile-Arthur Desnoyers, (10 September 1826  – 5 November 1869 ) was a 19th-century French writer and literary critic.

The journalist and playwright Edmond de Biéville (1814–1880) was his brother.

Biography 
He was part of Henry Murger's circle and an editor at the Polichinelle.

When he died, the paper Le Temps 8 November 1869 read:

Publications 
1853: Chants et chansons de la bohême, illustrés de 26 jolis dessins par Nadar, with contributions by Henry Murger, Pierre Dupont, Gustave Mathieu, Antonio Watripon, Léon Noel, Charles Vincent, Pierre Bry, Louis Barré, Benjamin Gastineau, Édouard Plouvier, Alfred Delvau, Charles Guignard, Abel Duvernoy, Chatillon, in-12, J. Bry aîné libraire-éditeur, Paris
1856: Le Bras noir, pantomime in verse by Ferdinand Desnoyers, représentée pour la première fois, à Paris, par le Théâtre des Folies-Nouvelles, 8 février 1856, dessin d'après Courbet, Librairie théâtrale, Paris
1860: Almanach parisien pour 1860, 1ère année, in-12, E. Pick de l'Isère, Paris
1861: Le Théâtre de Polichinelle : Prologue en vers par Ferdinand Desnoyers pour l'ouverture du Théâtre de marionnettes dans le jardin des Tuileries, in-4, Auguste Poulet-Malassis and de Broise, Paris 
1861 : Almanach parisien pour 1861, 2ème année, in-12, E. Pick de l'Isère, Paris
1862 : Étrennes parisiennes : Petit tableau de Paris illustré, avec un nouveau calendrier pour 1862 : Mœurs, curiosités, coutumes, histoire, littérature, anecdotes, récits pittoresques, poésie, science, arts, bals, théâtres, etc. etc. by Ferdinand Desnoyers, with the assistance of Théophile Gautier, Charles Baudelaire ..., E. Pick de l'Isère, Paris
1863 : Salon des refusés. La peinture en 1863, Azur Dutil éditeur, Paris 
1864 : Une journée de Pick de l'Isère, suivie de quelques aventures du Gil Blas de la librairie française, Imprimerie Simon Raçon et compagnie, Paris 
1865: Chansons parisiennes, E. Pick de l'Isère éditeur, Paris
1867: Muséum contemporain 5. Feld-Maréchal Benedeck. Biographies, Robe, Paris
1869: Le vin, vers fantasques. La campagne, in-12, Alcan-Lévy, Paris

 References 

 Sources 
 Antoine Laporte,  Histoire littéraire du dix-neuvième siècle manuel critique et raisonné: de livres rares, curieux et singuliers ... supplément de brunet, de quérard, de Barier, etc, Volume 3''

Writers from Paris
1826 births
1869 deaths
19th-century French dramatists and playwrights
19th-century French poets
French literary critics